Rainy City Roller Dolls (RCRD) is a women's flat track roller derby league based in Centralia, Washington. Founded in 2007, the league consists of a single team, which competes against teams from other leagues. Rainy City is a member of the Women's Flat Track Derby Association (WFTDA).

History
The league was founded in September 2007 by thirteen skaters,  By October, it was already practicing three times a week.

Since 2008, Rainy City has organized the annual "Knocktoberfest", a four-team tournament.  In April 2011, it was accepted as a member of the Women's Flat Track Derby Association Apprentice Program, and, in December 2012, it graduated to full membership.

Starting in May of 2018, Rainy City will host a six team WFTDA sanctioned tournament called "Reign the Pain" at the RollerDrome in Centralia.

WFTDA rankings

NR = not ranked in this release

References

Roller derby leagues established in 2007
Roller derby leagues in Washington (state)
Centralia, Washington
Women's Flat Track Derby Association Division 3
2007 establishments in Washington (state)